The 1905 North Kildare by-election was a parliamentary by-election held for the United Kingdom House of Commons constituency of North Kildare on 14 February 1905. The vacancy arose because of the death of the sitting member, Edmund Leamy of the Irish Parliamentary Party. Only one candidate was nominated, John O'Connor representing the Irish Parliamentary Party, who was elected unopposed.

Result

References

1905 elections in the United Kingdom
February 1905 events
By-elections to the Parliament of the United Kingdom in County Kildare constituencies
Unopposed by-elections to the Parliament of the United Kingdom in Irish constituencies
1905 elections in Ireland